Buffalo is a town and county seat of Harper County, Oklahoma, United States.  The population was 1,299 at the 2010 census. It was named after the Buffalo Creek valley, in which it is located.

History
In 1907, the town was "staked out" and a post office was established with the name Buffalo, which was derived from nearby Buffalo Creek.  In 1908, a county seat election gave the seat to Buffalo and the town was incorporated in the same year. Buffalo's founders issued instructions for all buildings to be built of stone, thereby many of those structures survived the test of time.

When citizens of Harper County decided to link their county seat with the railroads, they created the Buffalo and Northwestern Railroad, which arrived in Buffalo in May of 1920.  However, that trackage was abandoned in 1982, and Buffalo currently has no rail service.

Geography

Doby Springs Park and Campgrounds, located about 11 miles west, includes a fishing lake, camping sites, a playground, and nature trails along rolling canyons.  The complex also has a PGA-rated 9-hole golf course.

Climate
While not the snowiest location in Oklahoma ranked by highest annual average snowfall, Buffalo has the distinction of holding the State snowfall record over 24 hours, being 23” which fell February 21, 1971.

Demographics

As of the census of 2000, there were 1,200 people, 495 households, and 336 families residing in the town. The racial makeup of the town was 92.92% White, 0.08% African American, 1.17% Native American, 4.67% from other races, and 1.17% from two or more races. Hispanic or Latino of any race were 10.33% of the population.

There were 495 households, out of which 28.9% had children under the age of 18 living with them, 56.0% were married couples living together, 8.7% had a female householder with no husband present, and 32.1% were non-families. 28.7% of all households were made up of individuals, and 15.8% had someone living alone who was 65 years of age or older. The average household size was 2.34 and the average family size was 2.87.

In the town, the population was spread out, with 22.8% under the age of 18, 7.5% from 18 to 24, 22.8% from 25 to 44, 24.2% from 45 to 64, and 22.8% who were 65 years of age or older. The median age was 43 years. For every 100 females, there were 91.4 males. For every 100 females age 18 and over, there were 92.5 males.

The median income for a household in the town was $30,433, and the median income for a family was $38,333. Males had a median income of $25,625 versus $20,515 for females. The per capita income for the town was $15,328. About 8.2% of families and 11.7% of the population were below the poverty line, including 18.1% of those under age 18 and 5.4% of those age 65 or over.

Education
Buffalo School District oversees primary and secondary education.

Media
The Buffalo Weekly News was established in 2014 and is published every Wednesday.

The Harper County Journal, consolidated from the Buffalo Republican and the Harper County Democrat, was published in Buffalo from 1903-2014, when it merged with the Laverne Leader Tribune to become the Harper County Leader, still published weekly in Laverne, Oklahoma.  

Other early newspapers included the Buffalo News, the Buffalo Bugle, and the Post.

Transportation
U.S. Route 64 and U.S. Route 183 run concurrently through town.  

Buffalo Municipal Airport is located about 2 miles north.

Historic sites

The following in the Buffalo area are NRHP-listed:
 Buffalo City Park Pavilion
 Farmers’ Co-op Elevator
 Feuquay Elevator
 Harper County Courthouse
 I.O.O.F. Building of Buffalo
 Monhollow Artificial Stone House
 Page Soddy

References

External links

 City of Buffalo
 Harper County Oklahoma Tourism Website
 Buffalo Public Schools
 Buffalo Theatre and Community Centre
 Encyclopedia of Oklahoma History and Culture - Buffalo

Towns in Harper County, Oklahoma
Towns in Oklahoma
County seats in Oklahoma